The Aden Airport attack was a grenade attack which took place on 17 September 1965 and resulted in the injury of nine people. Great Britain accused the attackers of being "externally controlled", referring to Gamal Abdel Nasser's Republic of Egypt. The attack prompted Great Britain to suspend the constitution of the Aden Protectorate on 25 September, in an attempt to put an end to the violence. High Commissioner of Aden Richard Turnbull thus governed the protectorate alone under the suspension order signed by Queen Elizabeth II.

References

Aden Emergency
1965 in the Federation of South Arabia
September 1965 events in Asia
Attacks on airports
Attacks on buildings and structures in the 1960s